Strousi is a village in the western part of the municipal unit of Andravida in Elis, Greece. It is situated in a flat rural area, 1 km south of Myrsini, 3 km west of Andravida, 3 km east of Neochori and 3 km northeast of Dimitra.

External links
GTP - Strousi

See also

List of settlements in Elis

References

Populated places in Elis